SS Gneisenau was a  Norddeutscher Lloyd ocean liner that was launched and completed in 1935. Like several other German ships of the same name, she was named after the Prussian Generalfeldmarschall and military reformer August Neidhardt von Gneisenau (1760–1831).

Gneisenau was the second of three sister ships built for NDL, with the sisters being the Potsdam (later Empire Fowey) and the Scharnhorst. DeSchiMAG in Bremen built Gneisenau.

Gneisenau was launched in Bremen on 17 May 1935.

Gneisenau'''s maiden voyage began on Friday 3 January 1936.

Until the outbreak of World War II, she worked NDL's express service between Bremen and the Far East. At  she was among the fastest ships on the route.

On 2 May 1943, Gneisenau'' was mined in the Baltic Sea, capsized, and sank. The wreck was raised on 12 July 1950 and scrapped in Denmark.

References

Sources and further reading

1935 ships
Ocean liners
Passenger ships of Germany
Ships of Norddeutscher Lloyd
World War II merchant ships of Germany
Maritime incidents in May 1943
Ships sunk by mines
World War II shipwrecks in the Baltic Sea